Agonopterix intersecta is a moth in the family Depressariidae. It was described by Ivan Nikolayevich Filipjev in 1929. It is found in Mongolia, the Russian Far East and Japan.

References

Moths described in 1929
Agonopterix
Moths of Asia